The 1928 Primera División was the 13th season of top-flight Peruvian football. A total of 19 teams competed in this league, with Alianza Lima successfully defending their title. The first Superclásico was contested in this season.

Changes from 1927

Structural changes
The Peruvian Football Federation invited 11 teams to compete in the league and divided them into two groups. The top two in Group 1 and the top three in Group 2 advanced to the championship group. The relegation system was reintroduced.

Promotion
11 teams were promoted to compete in the 1928 season. They were Sportivo Unión, Alianza Chorrillos, Santa Catalina, Lawn Tennis, Alberto Secada, Federación Universitaria, Jorge Washington, Alianza Callao, Jose Alaya, Jorge Chávez (C) and Unión.

First stage

Group 1

Group 2

Championship group

Championship playoffs

Title

Liguilla de promoción

External links
Peru 1928 season at RSSSF
Peruvian Football League News 

1928
Peru
1928 in Peruvian football